The 2018 Trofej Umag was the 6th edition of the Trofej Umag road cycling one day race. It was part of UCI Europe Tour in category 1.2.

Teams
Thirty teams were invited to take part in the race. All of them were UCI Continental teams.

Result

References

2018 UCI Europe Tour
2018 in Croatian sport
Cycle races in Croatia